Tasha Boerner Horvath (born February 1, 1973) is an American politician who serves in the California State Assembly. A Democrat, she represents the 76th Assembly District, which encompasses coastal parts of northern San Diego County and the city of San Diego, including Carlsbad, Encinitas, Solana Beach, La Jolla, and Coronado. Prior to being elected to the State Assembly, she served on the Encinitas City Council.

Boerner Horvath was first elected to the State Assembly in November 2018 after defeating fellow Democrat Elizabeth Warren, a freelance journalist, not related to the former Presidential candidate of the same name.  In 2020, she won a second term over former Secret Service Agent Melanie Burkholder.  In 2022, Boerner Horvath announced her intention to seek election to a third term, this time for the 77th district. In 2022, she was opposed in the general election by Republican entrepreneur and investment advisor Dan Downey.

Biography 
Boerner Horvath earned an M.A. in International Studies from Claremont Graduate University Institute of Politics and Policy. Part of Tasha's graduate work was done at Humboldt University of Berlin. She received her B.A. in Political Science in 1995 from the University of California, Berkeley.

2018 California State Assembly election

2020 California State Assembly election

References

External links 
 Join California Tasha Boerner Horvath
 
 Campaign website

Democratic Party members of the California State Assembly
Claremont Graduate University alumni
UC Berkeley College of Letters and Science alumni
1973 births
Living people
People from Encinitas, California
21st-century American politicians
21st-century American women politicians
Women state legislators in California
Women city councillors in California